Xerochlorella is a genus of green algae in the class Trebouxiophyceae.

References

Trebouxiophyceae genera
Trebouxiophyceae